Several islands have been named Thompson's Island:

Thompson's Island is a small alluvial island in the upper Allegheny River. 
In the 18th century, Possession Island (Namibia) was also known as Thompson's Island.
On 25 March 1822, Lt. Commander Matthew C. Perry claimed Cayo Hueso (Key West), naming it Thompson's Island for US Secretary of the Navy Smith Thompson.
Thompson Island (Massachusetts) is an island in Boston Harbor.